Dato' Azhar Mansor is the first Malaysian to sail solo around the world. He made his trip in 1999, sailing the ship Jalur Gemilang. His round the world trip, with stops, took 190 days, 6 hours 57 minutes and 2 seconds

Successes
Datuk Azhar has managed to set a new world record via an East about route, attempted by no-one and has been verified by the WSSRC (World Speed Sailing Record Council) as an official record.

Azhar is currently based in Langkawi managing Telaga Harbour Park, one of Malaysia's finest marinas.

Footnotes

Living people
People from Perlis
Malaysian sailors
Single-handed circumnavigating sailors
Malaysian people of Malay descent
Malaysian Muslims
1958 births